Encolpotis is a genus of moths in the family Gelechiidae.

Species
 Encolpotis heliopepta Meyrick, 1918
 Encolpotis scioplasta Meyrick, 1920
 Encolpotis xanthoria Meyrick, 1909

References

Gelechiinae
Taxa named by Edward Meyrick
Moth genera